In October 2011, Independence Blue Cross launched a private, charitable foundation— the Independence Blue Cross (IBC) Foundation— with a mission to transform health care through innovation in the communities it serves.

Their mission is defined by the foundation's core principles: Thought leadership, Innovation, Collaboration, Engagement, and Sustainability.

The IBC Foundation funds research, grants, programs, and initiatives that advance caring for the Philadelphia region's most vulnerable, enhance health care delivery, and build healthy communities.

Blue Safety Net Grants 
The IBC Foundation's Blue Safety Net program provides grants to non-profit, privately funded "safety net" health clinics that provide free or nominal-fee care to the uninsured and medically underserved in local communities in Philadelphia.

Nurses for Tomorrow Program 
Nurses for Tomorrow is an initiative designed to address the shortage of nurses and nursing educators and support the ability for nurses to practice effectively. The program includes nursing scholarship grants to local schools in the Philadelphia region, continuing education workshops, and nursing internships at either the IBC Foundation or Independence Blue Cross.

Healthy Futures Initiative 
In September 2013, the IBC Foundation launched Healthy Futures, a three-year, $2.7 million program to improve child wellness in the Philadelphia region. The Healthy Futures initiative is built on three main principles: eat right, get fit, and stay well. The IBC Foundation partners with many local organizations to teach children how to live a healthier life.

Key Partners:
 Children's Hospital Of Philadelphia
 Fit Essentials
 Greener Partners
 InnerLink — Health eTools for Schools
 Philadelphia Union
 Vetri Foundation for Children
 Villanova University College of Nursing's MacDonald Center for Obesity Prevention and Education

References 

Health charities in the United States
Healthcare in Philadelphia
Medical and health organizations based in Pennsylvania